Kyle Phillips may refer to:

Kyle Phillips (baseball) (born 1984), American baseball player
Kyle Phillips (American football) (born 1997), American football defensive end
Kyle Philips, American football wide receiver
Kyle Meredith Phillips Jr. (1934–1988), American historian

See also
Kyle Phillip (born 1997), Trinidadian cricketer
Kyler Phillips (born 1995), American mixed martial artist